An Gyeong-ja (born 8 August 1950) is a South Korean volleyball player. She competed in the women's tournament at the 1968 Summer Olympics.

References

External links
 

1950 births
Living people
South Korean women's volleyball players
Olympic volleyball players of South Korea
Volleyball players at the 1968 Summer Olympics
People from Asan
Sportspeople from South Chungcheong Province